Delias ladas is a butterfly in the family Pieridae. It was described by Henley Grose-Smith in 1894. It is endemic to New Guinea.

The wingspan is about 65–70 mm. Adults may be distinguished by their almost uniformly black hindwing underside marked only by a small yellow spot on the margin.

Subspecies
D. l. ladas (West Papua New Guinea)
D. l. levis Joicey & Talbot, 1922 (Arfak and Weyland Mountains, Irian Jaya)
D. l. waigeuensis Joicey & Talbot, 1917 (Waigeu Island)
D. l. wamenaensis Morita, 1993 (Ilaga - Wamena, Irian Jaya)
D. l. yapenensis Yagishita, 1998 (Yapen Island)
D. l. fakfakensis Yagishita, 2003 (Fakfak, Irian Jaya)

References

External links
Delias at Markku Savela's Lepidoptera and Some Other Life Forms

ladas
Butterflies described in 1894
Endemic fauna of New Guinea